Morris–Lull Farm, also known as Elmwood Farm, is a historic farm and national historic district located at Morris in Otsego County, New York.  It encompasses two contributing buildings and one contributing site. They are an early 20th-century, two-story T-shaped barn; a privy; and the farm landscape.  The farmhouse, known as Elmwood, is a two-story Federal style stone house, five bays wide and two bays deep.

It was listed on the National Register of Historic Places in 2005.

References

Historic districts on the National Register of Historic Places in New York (state)
Federal architecture in New York (state)
Houses in Otsego County, New York
National Register of Historic Places in Otsego County, New York
Farms on the National Register of Historic Places in New York (state)